Lawrence Moptyd  was a priest and academic in the mid sixteenth century.

Moptyd was born in Foulden. He was educated at Corpus Christi College, Cambridge, graduating B.A. in 1530; MA in 1533; and B.D. in 1549. He was a Fellow of Gonville Hall for many years; and Master of Corpus from 1553 to 1557.  He held livings at Haslingfield and Teversham. He died at the Master's Lodge on 7 December 1557.

References 

Alumni of Corpus Christi College, Cambridge
Fellows of Gonville Hall, Cambridge
Masters of Corpus Christi College, Cambridge
1557 deaths
People from Breckland District